Antonie Schläger (4 May 1859 – 29 August 1910) was an Austrian operatic soprano and mezzo-soprano, taking leading roles in Vienna at the Carltheater and at the Court Opera.

Life
Schläger {originally Lautenschläger) was born in the Simmering district of Vienna in 1859, daughter of a grocer. She first worked in a type foundry; from the age of 17 she sang in the chorus of the Carltheater in Vienna. She took singing lessons with Johann Brandl, conductor of the theatre orchestra, and in 1879 played her first role in the Carltheater, as a ship cadet in Charles Lecocq's operetta Les cent vierges. This was followed by leading roles there in operettas by Jacques Offenbach, Johann Strauss II and Franz von Suppé.

Afterwards she appeared as a concert singer, and as a guest singer at the Theater an der Wien and at the Court Opera. In 1894 she married Victor von Theumer, an officer.

Gustav Mahler's efforts to bring her back to the Court Opera failed; she ended her career and retired to her property Gstettenhof, a much-visited inn in Steinbachrotte near Türnitz. She died there in 1910.

References

1859 births
1910 deaths
19th-century Austrian women opera singers
Austrian operatic sopranos